The 1983 NCAA Women's Lacrosse Championship was the second annual single-elimination tournament to determine the national championship of NCAA women's college lacrosse. The championship game was played at Franklin Field in Philadelphia, Pennsylvania during May 1983.

The Delaware Blue Hens won their first championship by defeating the Temple Owls in the final, 10–7. 

The leading scorer for the tournament was Karen Emas, from Delaware, with 14 goals. Emas was also named the Most Outstanding Player of the tournament.

Qualification 
Until 1985, there was only one NCAA championship; a Division III title was added in 1985 and a Division II title in 2001. Hence, all NCAA women's lacrosse programs were eligible for this championship. A total of 12 teams were invited to contest the tournament, expanding on the 2 teams from the previous year. Eleven teams made their debuts in the NCAA tournament this year.

Tournament bracket

Tournament outstanding players 
Anne Brooking, Delaware
Karen Emas, Delaware (Most Outstanding Player)
Missy Meharg, Delaware
Linda Schmidt, Delaware
Rita Hubneri, Massachusetts
Pam Moryl, Massachusetts
Carol Progulske, Massachusetts
Marsha Florio, Penn State
Barb Jordan, Penn State
Jane Koffenberger, Penn State
Kathleen Barrett Geiger, Temple
Marie Schmucker, Temple

See also 
 NCAA Division I Women's Lacrosse Championship
 1983 NCAA Division I Men's Lacrosse Championship

References

NCAA Division I Women's Lacrosse Championship
NCAA Division I Women's Lacrosse Championship
NCAA Women's Lacrosse Championship